Kenneth Mejia (born November 7, 1990) is an American activist, accountant, and politician, serving as the City Controller of Los Angeles since 2022. A member of the Democratic Party and a former Green Party member, Mejia was a three-time candidate for the United States House of Representatives in California's 34th congressional district, prior to his candidacy and subsequent election as City Controller in 2022.

Elected to succeed Ron Galperin, Mejia is the first Filipino American elected official in the city of Los Angeles, the first Asian American elected to a citywide office, the youngest, and the first person of color to hold the position of City Controller in over a century.

Early life and career 
Mejia is Filipino American and was born and grew up in Los Angeles. Mejia graduated from Woodbury University in two and a half years, finishing in 2010 with a B.S. in accounting.

Mejia has held his Certified Public Accountant (CPA) designation since around 2013, although the status of his CPA license was "expired" or "inactive" from November 2018 until January 2022.  He worked at Ernst & Young but left in 2014.  He then worked for a hedge fund according to his Twitter account, which he left May 6, 2016, to focus on his campaign. In 2016, he co-founded We Can Make a Difference, a community volunteer organization that provided food and hygiene items to low-income and homeless people in Los Angeles. He then worked at EVgo but left in late 2021 to focus on campaigning. Mejia is a member of the LA Tenants' Union.

Early political campaigns

California's 34th congressional district 
Mejia was inspired by the 2016 presidential campaign of Bernie Sanders to engage more in politics, leading him to become a candidate to the California delegation to the Democratic National Convention. Mejia was a write-in Democratic Party candidate in California's 34th congressional district in 2016.

Having grown disenchanted with the Democratic Party, Mejia ran as a US Green Party candidate in the same district in 2017 and 2018. His 2017 bid was noted for its reliance on small-dollar donations. Mejia's 2018 bid advanced to the general election and yielded more than 40,000 votes, setting the record for the highest vote percentage cast for any Green candidate against a Democrat for Congress. Mejia continued to work as an accountant while campaigning in 2018.

Los Angeles City Controller (2022—present)

Election 
Mejia announced his candidacy for City Controller, a nonpartisan office, in the 2022 Los Angeles elections. It has been historically uncommon for the city controller to have extensive accounting experience; Mejia claims the office has never been held by a CPA. He was the only city candidate in 2022 position to have received ballot access through signatures alone. During his candidacy, Mejia drew attention to LA fire department employees receiving more than half a million dollars a year, the use of about half of the city's funds from the American Rescue Plan on the LA police department, and the amount of police funding in the budget proposed in 2022 by Mayor Eric Garcetti.
Mejia published interactive online maps of affordable housing, LAPD traffic stops, parking tickets, and where LA municipal employees live. He's also published a database of the Los Angeles City Payroll using numbers from the outgoing City Controller's website.

Mejia's past tweets criticizing Joe Biden generated controversy during the race.

On June 7, 2022, Mejia took first place in the primary for LA City Controller, with over 230,163 votes. He obtained 42.75% of the vote, while opponents Paul Koretz and Stephanie Clements obtained 23.83% and 16.01%. On November 8, 2022, Mejia won the general election with 62% of the vote, defeating Koretz.

Tenure 
Mejia appointed Rick Cole to serve as his Chief Deputy Controller and Sergio Perez to serve as Chief of Accountability and Oversight. Cole is an Urban Studies Professor and was the former mayor of Pasadena and deputy mayor for Los Angeles. Sergio Perez left his position as the Los Angeles Department of Water and Power's Inspector General to serve.

Electoral history

2016 California's 34th congressional district election

2017 California's 34th congressional district special election

2018 California's 34th congressional district election 

|- class="vcard"
| style="background-color: #3333FF; width: 2px;" |
| class="org" style="width: 130px" | Democratic
| class="fn"    | Jimmy Gomez (incumbent)
| style="text-align:right;" | 54,661
| style="text-align:right;" | 78.7
|-
|- class="vcard"
| style="background-color: #17aa5c; width: 2px;" |
| class="org" style="width: 130px" | Green
| class="fn"    | Kenneth Mejia
| style="text-align:right;" | 8,987
| style="text-align:right;" | 12.9
|-
|- class="vcard"
| style="background-color: #FED105; width: 2px;" |
| class="org" style="width: 130px" | Libertarian
| class="fn"    | Angela Elise McArdle
| style="text-align:right;" | 5,804
| style="text-align:right;" | 8.4
|-

|- class="vcard"
| style="background-color: #3333FF; width: 5px;" |
| class="org" style="width: 130px" | Democratic 
| class="fn" | Jimmy Gomez (incumbent) 
| style="text-align: right; margin-right: 0.5em" |  
| style="text-align: right; margin-right: 0.5em" | 72.5 
|-
|- class="vcard"
| style="background-color: #17aa5c; width: 2px;" |
| class="org" style="width: 130px" | Green
| class="fn"    | Kenneth Mejia
| style="text-align:right;" | 41,711
| style="text-align:right;" | 27.5
|-

2022 Los Angeles City Controller election

References 

21st-century American politicians
Politicians from Los Angeles
Woodbury University alumni
American people of Filipino descent
Accountants
American housing activists
Activists from California
Activists from Los Angeles
California Democrats
California Greens
California socialists
Democratic Socialists of America politicians from California
Living people
1990 births